The Martinsville Bulletin is a daily newspaper serving the city of Martinsville and the surrounding Henry County, Virginia.  The Bulletin'''s roots date back to 1889, and it is the oldest continuously run business in Martinsville.  The paper is currently published six days a week, Monday through Friday and Sunday. It is owned by Lee Enterprises.

History
The paper was started in 1889, as a weekly publication called The Henry Bulletin, serving Henry County and Martinsville.  The Bulletin increased its publication frequency, until it eventually became a daily paper in 1935 and was renamed The Daily Bulletin.

In a deal announced on March 31, 2015, the Bulletin and The Franklin News-Post were purchased from Haskell Newspapers by BH Media Group. Haskell Newspapers was a company privately owned by the Haskell family. The Haskell family bought the Martinsville Bulletin'' in 1948. With the culmination of the purchase, BH Media owns nine daily newspapers in Virginia.

References

External links 
 
 

1889 establishments in Virginia
Daily newspapers published in Virginia
Lee Enterprises publications
Martinsville, Virginia
Publications established in 1889